Following the 1987 initial release of Games Workshop's Warhammer 40,000 wargame, set in a far future military science fantasy universe, the company began publishing background literature that expands previous material, adds new material, and describes the universe, its characters, and its events in detail.

Since 1997, the bulk of background literature has been published by the affiliated imprint Black Library. The increasing number of fiction works by an expanding list of authors is published in several formats and media, including audio, digital and print. Most of the works, which include full-length novels, novellas, short stories, graphic novels, and audio dramas, are parts of named book series.

The Horus Heresy

Novel series
Book 001 - Horus Rising by Dan Abnett (2006, reissue 2018)
Book 002 - False Gods by Graham McNeill (June 2006)
Book 003 - Galaxy in Flames by Ben Counter (October 2006)
Book 004 - The Flight of the Eisenstein by James Swallow (March 2007)
Book 005 - Fulgrim by Graham McNeill (July 2007)
Book 006 - Descent of Angels by Mitchell Scanlon (October 2007)
Book 007 - Legion by Dan Abnett (March 2008)
Book 008 - Battle for the Abyss by Ben Counter (August 2008)
Book 009 - Mechanicum by Graham McNeill (December 2008)
Book 010 - Tales of Heresy by "various authors", edited by Nick Kyme and Lindsey Priestley (anthology) (April 2009)
Book 011 - Fallen Angels by Mike Lee (July 2009)
Book 012 - A Thousand Sons by Graham McNeill (March 2010)
Book 013 - Nemesis by James Swallow (August 2010)
Book 014 - The First Heretic by Aaron Dembski-Bowden (November 2010)
Book 015 - Prospero Burns by Dan Abnett (January 2011)
Book 016 - Age of Darkness by "various authors", edited by Christian Dunn (anthology) (May 2011)
Book 017 - The Outcast Dead by Graham McNeill (November 2011)
Book 018 - Deliverance Lost by Gav Thorpe (January 2012)
Book 019 - Know No Fear by Dan Abnett (February 2012)
Book 020 - The Primarchs by "various authors", edited by Christian Dunn (anthology) (May 2012)
Book 021 - Fear to Tread by James Swallow (August 2012)
Book 022 - Shadows of Treachery by "various authors", edited by Christian Dunn and Nick Kyme (anthology) (September 2012)
Book 023 - Angel Exterminatus by Graham McNeill (January 2013)
Book 024 - Betrayer by Aaron Dembski-Bowden (March 2013)
Book 025 - Mark of Calth by "various authors", edited by Laurie Goulding (anthology) (April 2013)
Book 026 - Vulkan Lives by Nick Kyme (August 2013)
Book 027 - The Unremembered Empire by Dan Abnett (January 2014)
Book 028 - Scars by Chris Wraight (April 2014)
Book 029 - Vengeful Spirit by Graham McNeill (May 2014)
Book 030 - The Damnation of Pythos by David Annandale (November 2014)
Book 031 - Legacies of Betrayal by "various authors", edited by Graham McNeill (anthology) (February 2015)
Book 032 - Deathfire by Nick Kyme (November 2015)
Book 033 - War Without End by "various authors" (anthology) (January 2016)
Book 034 - Pharos by Guy Haley (February 2016)
Book 035 - Eye of Terra by "various authors" (anthology) (March 2016)
Book 036 - The Path of Heaven by Chris Wraight (April 2016)
Book 037 - The Silent War by "various authors", edited by Laurie Goulding (anthology) (May 2016)
Book 038 - Angels of Caliban by Gav Thorpe (June 2016)
Book 039 - Praetorian of Dorn by John French (August 2016)
Book 040 - Corax by Gav Thorpe (anthology) (October 2016)
Book 041 - The Master of Mankind by Aaron Dembski-Bowden (December 2016)
Book 042 - Garro by James Swallow (anthology) (February 2017)
Book 043 - Shattered Legions by "various authors", edited by Laurie Goulding (anthology) (April 2017)
Book 044 - The Crimson King by Graham McNeill (June 2017)
Book 045 - Tallarn by John French (anthology) (August 2017)
Book 046 - Ruinstorm by David Annandale (October 2017)
Book 047 - Old Earth by Nick Kyme (December 2017)
Book 048 - The Burden of Loyalty by "various authors", edited by Laurie Goulding (anthology) (February 2018)
Book 049 - Wolfsbane by Guy Haley (May 2018)
Book 050 - Born of Flame by Nick Kyme (anthology) (June 2018)
Book 051 - Slaves to Darkness by John French (August 2018)
Book 052 - Heralds of the Siege by "various authors", edited by Nick Kyme and Laurie Goulding (anthology) (October 2018)
Book 053 - Titandeath by Guy Haley (December 2018)
Book 054 - The Buried Dagger by James Swallow (February 2019)

The saga chronologically continued with the Siege of Terra novels.

Siege of Terra novel series
Book 001 - The Solar War by John French (May 2019)
Book 002 - The Lost and the Damned by Guy Haley (October 2019)
Book 003 - The First Wall by Gav Thorpe (March 2020)
Book 004 - Saturnine by Dan Abnett (June 2020)
Book 005 - Mortis by John Fench (January 2021)
Book 006 - Warhawk by Chris Wraight (October 2021)
Book 007 - Echoes of Eternity by Aaron Dembski-Bowden (September 2022)

Primarchs of The Horus Heresy
Roboute Guilliman: Lord of Ultramar by David Annandale (short novel) (2016)
Leman Russ: The Great Wolf by Chris Wraight (short novel) (2017)
Magnus the Red: Master of Prospero by Graham McNeill (short novel) (2017)
Perturabo: The Hammer of Olympia by Guy Haley (short novel) (2017)
Lorgar: Bearer of the Word by Gav Thorpe (short novel) (2017)
Fulgrim: The Palatine Phoenix by Josh Reynolds (short novel) (2018)
Ferrus Manus: The Gorgon of Medusa by David Guymer (short novel) (2018)
Jaghatai Khan: Warhawk of Chogoris by Chris Wraight (short novel) (2018)
Vulkan: Lord of Drakes by David Annandale (short novel) (2018)
Corax: Lord of Shadows by Guy Haley (short novel) (2018)
Angron: Slave of Nuceria by Ian St. Martin (short novel) (2019)
Konrad Curze: The Night Haunter by Guy Haley (short novel) (2019)
Lion El'Jonson: Lord of the First by David Guymer (short novel) (2020)
Alpharius: Head of the Hydra by Mike Brooks (short novel) (2021)
Mortarion: The Pale King by David Annandale (short novel) (2022)
Rogal Dorn: The Emperor's Crusader by Gav Thorpe (short novel) (2022)
Sanguinius: The Great Angel by Chris Wraight (short novel) (2022)
Sons of the Emperor by "various" (anthology) (2018)
The Lords of Terra by "various" (audio anthology) (2018)
Scions of the Emperor by "various" (anthology) (2019)
Blood of the Emperor by "various" (anthology) (2021)

Other characters from The Horus Heresy
Valdor: Birth of the Imperium by Chris Wraight (novel) (February 2020)
Luther: First of the Fallen by Gav Thorpe (novel) (March 2021)
Sigismund: The Eternal Crusader by John French (novel) (May 2022)

Novellas
Promethean Sun by Nick Kyme (limited edition) (May 2011) ... also included in the book nº 50
Aurelian by Aaron Dembski-Bowden (limited edition) (October 2011) ... also included in the book nº 35
The Reflection Crack'd by Graham McNeill (ebook) (May 2012) ... also included in the book nº 20
Feat of Iron by Nick Kyme (ebook) (May 2012) ... also included in the book nº 20
The Lion by Gav Thorpe (ebook) (May 2012) ... also included in the book nº 20
The Serpent Beneath by Rob Sanders (ebook) (May 2012) ... also included in the book nº 20
The Crimson Fist by John French (ebook) (July 2012) ... also included in the book nº 22
Brotherhood of the Storm by Chris Wraight (limited edition) (October 2012) ... also included in the book nº 31
Corax: Soulforge by Gav Thorpe (limited edition) (April 2013) ... also included in the book nº 40
Scorched Earth by Nick Kyme (short novel) (September 2013) ... also included in the book nº 50
Macragge's Honour by Dan Abnett (limited graphic novel) (November 2013)
Tallarn: Executioner by John French (short novel) (November 2013) ... also included in the book nº 45
Ravenlord by Gav Thorpe (short novel) (May 2014) ... also included in the book nº 40
The Purge by Anthony Reynolds (limited edition) (July 2014) ... also included in the book nº 37
The Seventh Serpent by Graham McNeill (limited edition) (December 2014) ... also included in the book nº 43
Tallarn: Ironclad by John French (limited edition) (February 2015) ... also included in the book nº 45
Cybernetica by Rob Sanders (limited edition) (July 2015) ... also included in the book nº 48
Wolf King by Chris Wraight (limited edition) (October 2015) ... also included in the book nº 48
The Honoured by Rob Sanders (ebook) (November 2015)
The Unburdened by David Annandale (ebook) (November 2015)
Garro: Vow of Faith by James Swallow (limited edition) (December 2015) ... also included in the book nº 42
Meduson: Ultimate Edition by "various artists" (anthology, limited edition) (May 2016) ... also included in the book nº 43
Weregeld by Gav Thorpe (exclusive novel) (October 2016) ... also included in the book nº 40
Sons of the Forge by Nick Kyme (limited edition) (November 2016) ... also included in the book nº 50

Siege of Terra novellas
Sons of the Selenar by Graham McNeill (April 2020)
The Fury of Magnus by Graham McNeill (August 2020)
Garro: Knight of Grey by James Swallow

Audio Dramas
The Dark King by Graham McNeill (June 2008) ... also included in the book nº 22
The Lightning Tower by Dan Abnett (June 2008) ... also included in the book nº 22
Raven's Flight by Gav Thorpe (February 2010) ... also included in the book nº 22
Garro: Oath of Moment by James Swallow (December 2010) ... also included in the book nº 42
Garro: Legion of One by James Swallow (April 2011) ... also included in the book nº 42
Butcher's Nails by Aaron Dembski-Bowden (August 2012) ... also included in the book nº 31
Grey Angel by John French (August 2012) ... also included in the book nº 37
Prince of Crows by Aaron Dembski-Bowden (September 2012) ... also included in the book nº 22
Garro: Burden of Duty by James Swallow (October 2012) ... also included in the book nº 42
Warmaster by John French (special edition) (December 2012) ... also included in the book nº 31
Strike and Fade by Guy Haley (special edition) (December 2012) ... also included in the book nº 31
Veritas Ferrum by David Annandale (special edition) (December 2012) ... also included in the book nº 31
Garro: Sword of Truth by James Swallow (December 2012) ... also included in the book nº 42
The Sigillite by Chris Wraight (March 2013) ... also included in the book nº 37
Wolf Hunt by Graham McNeill (May 2013) ... also included in the book nº 37
Honour to the Dead by Gav Thorpe (September 2013) ... also included in the book nº 31
Censure by Nick Kyme (October 2013) ... also included in the book nº 31
Thief of Revelations by Graham McNeill (November 2013) ... also included in the book nº 31
Khârn: The Eightfold Path by Anthony Reynolds (special edition) (December 2013) ... also included in the book nº 31
Lucius: The Eternal Blade by Graham McNeill (special edition) (December 2013) ... also included in the book nº 31
Cypher: Guardian of Order by Gav Thorpe (special edition) (December 2013) ... also included in the book nº 31
Hunter's Moon by Guy Haley (January 2014) ... also included in the book nº 31
Wolf's Claw by Chris Wraight (March 2014) ... also included in the book nº 31
Master of the First by Gav Thorpe (October 2014) ... also included in the book nº 35
Templar by John French (November 2014) ... also included in the book nº 37
Garro: Shield of Lies by James Swallow (December 2014) ... also included in the book nº 42
The Long Night by Aaron Dembski-Bowden (January 2015) ... also included in the book nº 35
The Eagle's Talon by John French (January 2015) ... also included in the book nº 35
Iron Corpses by David Annandale (February 2015) ... also included in the book nº 35
Garro: Ashes of Fealty by James Swallow (February 2015) ... also included in the book nº 42
Raptor by Gav Thorpe (June 2015) ... also included in the book nº 40
Red-Marked by Nick Kyme (January 2016) ... also included in the book nº 35
The Heart of the Pharos by L.J. Goulding (March 2016) ... also included in the book nº 48
Echoes of Imperium by Andy Smillie, Nick Kyme, C.Z. Dunn & Gav Thorpe (the anthology includes "The Herald of Sanguinius" (also included in the book nº 35), "Stratagem" (also included in the book nº 35), "The Watcher" (also included in the book nº 37) & "The Shadowmasters" (also included in the book nº 40) (September 2016)
Children of Sicarus by Anthony Reynolds (October 2016) ... also included in the book nº 52
The Thirteenth Wolf by Gav Thorpe (November 2016) ... also included in the book nº 48
Virtues of the Sons / Sins of the Father by Andy Smillie (January 2017) ... also included in the book nº 33 / also included in the book nº 35
The Binary Succession by David Annandale (March 2017) ... also included in the book nº 48
Echoes of Revelation by Dan Abnett, Chris Wraight & Gav Thorpe (the anthology includes "Perpetual" (also included in the book nº 48), "The soul, severed" (also included in the book nº 52) & "Valerius" (also included in the book nº 52) (May 2017)
Dark Compliance by John French (July 2017) ... also included in the book nº 52
Blackshields: The False War by Josh Reynolds (September 2017)
Blackshields: The Red Fief by Josh Reynolds (May 2018)
Hubris of Monarchia by Andy Smillie (December 2018)
Nightfane by Nick Kyme (January 2019)
Blackshields: The Broken Chain by Josh Reynolds (July 2019)

Omnibus
Crusade's End (March 2016)
This omnibus edition contains the books Horus Rising, False Gods and Galaxy in Flames, and also the stories "The Wolf of Ash and Fire", "Lord of the Red Sands" and "Death of a Silversmith" included in book #35, #33, and #22 respectively

The Last Phoenix (May 2016)
This omnibus edition contains the books Fulgrim and Angel Exterminatus, the novellas The Crimson Fist and The Reflection Crack'd, and also the stories "The Phoenician", "Iron Within", "Imperfect", "Chirurgeon" and "Lucius the Eternal Blade" included in book #22, #20, #33, #16, #33, #33, and #31 respectively

The Razing of Prospero (July 2016)
This omnibus edition contains the books A Thousand Sons and Prospero Burns, and also the stories "Howl of the Hearthworld", "Rebirth", "Hunter's Moon" and "Thief of Revelations".

The Beast Arises
I Am Slaughter by Dan Abnett (January 2016)
Predator, Prey by Rob Sanders (February 2016)
The Emperor Expects by Gav Thorpe (March 2016)
The Last Wall by David Annandale (April 2016)
Throneworld by Guy Haley (May 2016)
Echoes of the Long War by David Guymer (June 2016)
The Hunt for Vulkan by David Annandale (July 2016)
The Beast Must Die by Gav Thorpe (July 2016)
Watchers in Death by David Annandale (August 2016)
The Last Son of Dorn by David Guymer (September 2016)
Shadow of Ullanor by Rob Sanders (October 2016)
The Beheading by Guy Haley (November 2016)

Adepta Sororitas
Faith and Fire by James Swallow (novel) (March 2006)
Red and Black by James Swallow (audio drama) (October 2011)
Hammer and Anvil by James Swallow (novel) (December 2011)
Celestine by Andy Clark (novel, limited) (January 2019)
Our Martyred Lady by Gav Thorpe (audio drama, boxed set) (February 2019)
Requiem Infernal by Peter Fehervari (novel) (April 2019)
Mark of Faith by Rachel Harrison (novel) (November 2019)
Broken Saints by Alec Worley (audio drama) (March 2020)

Adeptus Mechanicus

Forge of Mars series
Priests of Mars by Graham McNeill (novel 1) (July 2012)
Lords of Mars by Graham McNeill (novel 2) (September 2013)
Gods of Mars by Graham McNeill (novel 3) (November 2014)

Adeptus Mechanicus duology
Adeptus Mechanicus : Skitarius by Rob Sanders (novel) (April 2015)
Adeptus Mechanicus : Tech-Priest by Rob Sanders (novel) (June 2015)

Other stories
Servants of the Machine-God by "various" (anthology) (August 2018)
Belisarius Cawl: The Great Work by Guy Haley (novel) (September 2019)
Imperator: Wrath of the Omnissiah by Gav Thorpe (novel) (April 2018)
Day of Ascension by Adrian Tchaikovsky (February 2022)

Adeptus Titanicus
Titanicus by Dan Abnett (novel) (October 2008)
Warlord: Fury of the God-Machine by David Annandale (novel) (April 2017)
Imperator: Wrath of the Omnissiah by Gav Thorpe (novel) (April 2018)

Alpha Legion
Shroud of Night by Andy Clark (novel) (July 2017)
Sons of the Hydra by Rob Sanders (novel) (July 2018)

Astra Militarum

Novels
Fifteen Hours by Mitchell Scanlon (June 2005)
Death World by Steve Lyons (December 2006)
Rebel Winter by Steve Parker (July 2007)
Desert Raiders by Lucien Soulban (December 2007)
Ice Guard by Steve Lyons (January 2009)
Gunheads by Steve Parker (May 2009)
Cadian Blood by Aaron Dembski-Bowden (October 2009)
Redemption Corps by Rob Sanders (May 2010)
Dead Men Walking by Steve Lyons (December 2010)
Imperial Glory by Richard Williams (August 2011)
Iron Guard by Mark Clapham (July 2012)
Commissar by Andy Hoare (January 2013)
Baneblade by Guy Haley (April 2013)
Straken by Toby Frost (novel) (December 2014)
Shadowsword by Guy Haley (novel) (October 2016)
Honourbound: Severina Raine by Rachel Harrison (novel) (February 2019)

Other stories
Scions of Elysia by Chris Dows (audio drama) (June 2017)
Renegades of Elysia by Chris Dows (audio drama) (December 2017)
Martyrs of Elysia by Chris Dows (audio drama) (June 2018)
Taker of Heads by Ian St. Martin (audio drama) (September 2018)

Bastion Wars
Authored by Henry Zou
Emperor's Mercy (August 2009)
Flesh and Iron (April 2010)
Blood Gorgons (March 2011)

Blackstone Fortress
Blackstone Fortress by Darius Hink (novel 1) (May 2020)
Ascension by Darius Hink (novel 2) (September 2020)
The Beast Inside by Darius Hink (audio drama) (September 2019)
Vaults of Obsidian by "various" (anthology) (May 2020)
Augur of Despair by Chris Dows (audio drama) (September 2020)

Black Templars
Authored by Jonathan Green
Crusade for Armageddon (July 2003)
Conquest of Armageddon (December 2005)

Blood Angels

Novel series
Authored by James Swallow
Deus Encarmine (December 2004)
Deus Sanguinius (April 2005)
Red Fury (September 2008)
Black Tide (February 2010)

Other stories
Heart of Rage (novella) (July 2009)
Bloodline (novella) (September 2010)
Bloodquest : Prisoners of the Eye of Terror (audio drama) (December 2012)
Bloodspire (audio drama) (January 2013)
Dante by Guy Haley (novel) (March 2017)

Mephiston trilogy
Authored by Darius Hinks
Blood of Sanguinius (novel 1) (September 2017)
The Revenant Crusade (novel 2) (July 2018)
City of Light (novel 3) (December 2019)

Carcharodons
Red Tithe by Robbie MacNiven (novel 1) (January 2017)
Outer Dark by Robbie MacNiven (novel 2) (March 2018)

Chaos Space Marines

Abaddon the Despoiler
The Talon of Horus by Aaron Dembski-Bowden (novel 1) (November 2014)
Black Legion by Aaron Dembski-Bowden (novel 2) (August 2017)
Extinction by Aaron Dembski-Bowden (novel 0) (August 2013)... Collected in Gamesday Anthology 2012/13

Ahzek Ahriman
Exile by John French (novel 1) (June 2013)... Also collected in Ahriman: The Omnibus
Sorcerer by John French (novel 2) (December 2014)... Also collected in Ahriman: The Omnibus
Unchanged by John French (novel 3) (January 2016)... Also collected in Ahriman: The Omnibus
Eternal by John French (novel 4) (July 2022)

Khârn the Betrayer
Eater of Worlds by Anthony Reynolds (novel) (March 2015)
The Red Path by Chris Dows (anthology) (September 2016)

Fabius Bile
Primogenitor by Josh Reynolds (novel 1) (December 2016)
Clonelord by Josh Reynolds (novel 2) (December 2017)
Manflayer by Josh Reynolds (novel 3) (April 2020)

Lucius the Eternal
The Faultless Blade by Ian St. Martin (novel 1) (August 2017)

Ciaphas Cain

Authored by Alex Stewart under the pseudonym

Novel series
For the Emperor (November 2003)
Caves of Ice (January 2004)
The Traitor's Hand (May 2005)
Death or Glory (February 2006)
Duty Calls (May 2007)
Cain's Last Stand (November 2008)
The Emperor's Finest (December 2010)
The Last Ditch (February 2012)
The Greater Good (January 2013)
Choose Your Enemies (September 2018)

Other stories

 "Short Story 1: Fight or Flight" (2002)
 "Short Story 2: The Beguiling" (2003)
 "Short Story 3: Echoes of the Tomb" (2004)
 "Short Story 4: Sector Thirteen" (2005)
 "Short Story 5: Traitor's Gambit" (2009)
 "Audio Book 1: Dead in the Water" (2011)
 "Short Story 6: A Mug of Recaff" (2012)
 "Novella: Old Soldiers Never Die (2012)
 "Short Story 7: The Smallest Detail" (2012)
 "Short Story 8: The Little Things" (2012)
 "Audio Book 2: The Devil You Know" (2014)

Commisar Yarrick
Authored by David Annandale

Chains of Golgotha (novella) (January 2013)
Imperial Creed (novel 1) (June 2015)
The Pyres of Armageddon (novel 2) (May 2016)

Crimson Fists
Legacy of Dorn by Mike Lee (novel) (April 2018)

Dark Angels

Legacy of Caliban trilogy
Ravenwing by Gav Thorpe (January 2013)
Master of Sanctity by Gav Thorpe (June 2014)
The Unforgiven by Gav Thorpe (May 2015)

Other stories
Eye of Terror by Barrington J. Bayley (novel) (November 1999)
Angels of Darkness by Gav Thorpe (novel) (February 2003)
Dark Vengeance by C.Z. Dunn (novella) (September 2012)
The Book of the Lion by various (anthology) (January 2013)
Lords of Caliban by Gav Thorpe (anthology) (June 2015)

Dark Eldar
Authored by Andy Chambers

Novel trilogy
Path of the Renegade (February 2012)
Path of the Incubus (February 2013)
Path of the Archon (2014)

Other stories
The Masque of Vyle (novella) (February 2013)

Dark Heresy
Authored by Sandy Mitchell
Scourge The Heretic (February 2008)
Innocence Proves Nothing (November 2009)

Dawn of Fire
Avenging Son by Guy Haley (novel 1) (August 2020)
The Gate of Bones by Andy Clark (novel 2) (February 2021)
The Wolftime by Gav Thorpe (novel 3) (November 2021)
Throne Of Light by Guy Haley (novel 4) (April 2022)

Dawn of War

Novel trilogy
Authored by Cassern S. Goto
Dawn of War (November 2004)
Ascension (November 2005)
Tempest (September 2006)

Other stories
Dawn of War 2 by Chris Roberson (novel) (February 2009)
Dawn of War 3 by Robbie MacNiven (novel) (April 2017)

Death Guard
The Lords of Silence by Chris Wraight (novel) (August 2018)

Deathwatch

Novel duology
Authored by Cassern S. Goto
Warrior Brood (September 2005)
Warrior Coven (May 2006)

Other stories
Xenos Hunters by various (anthology) (September 2012)
Deathwatch: Ignition by various (anthology) (March 2016)
Deathwatch: The Last Guardian by C.Z. Dunn (audio drama) (August 2016)

Novel Series
Deathwatch by Steve Parker (novel 1) (May 2013)
Shadowbreaker by Steve Parker (novel 2) (April 2019)

Gathering Storm

Novel series
Dark Imperium by Guy Haley (novel 1) (June 2017)
Plague War by Guy Haley (novel 2) (October 2018)
GodBlight by Guy Haley (novel 3) (May 2021)

Other stories
Cadia Stands by Justin D. Hill (novel) (September 2017)
The Lords Of Silence by Chris Wraight (novel) (August 2018)
Spear of the Emperor by Aaron Dembski-Bowden (novel) (June 2019)
Lords and Tyrants by "various" (anthology) (April 2019)
Cadian Honour by Justin D. Hill (novel 1) (April 2019)

Gaunt's Ghosts

Authored by Dan Abnett

Novel series
First and Only (August 1999)
Ghostmaker (May 2000)
Necropolis (November 2000)
Honour Guard (August 2001)
The Guns of Tanith (April 2002)
Straight Silver (November 2002)
Sabbat Martyr (August 2003)
Traitor General (September 2004)
His Last Command (October 2005)
The Armour of Contempt (November 2006)
Only in Death (November 2007)
Blood Pact (November 2009)
Salvation's Reach (October 2011)
The Warmaster (December 2017)
The Anarch (January 2019)

Other stories
Sabbat Worlds (anthology) (2010)
Sabbat Crusade (anthology) (2014)
Double Eagle (novel) (September 2019). Hardcover 2004.

Genestealer Cults
Cult of the Warmason by C.L. Werner (novel 1) (March 2017)
Cult of the Spiral Dawn by Peter Fehervari (novel 2) (March 2018)
Day of Ascension by Adrian Tchaikovsky (February 2022)

Gothic War
Authored by Gordon Rennie
Execution Hour (June 2001)
Shadowpoint (March 2003)

Grey Knights

Novel trilogy
Authored by Ben Counter
Grey Knights (May 2004)
Dark Adeptus (January 2006)
Hammer of Daemons (February 2008)

Other stories
The Emperor's Gift by Aaron Dembski-Bowden (May 2012)

Castellan Crowe series
Warden of the Blade by David Annandale (novel 1) (November 2016)
Castellan by David Annandale (novel 2) (July 2018)

Imperial Knights
Kingsblade by Andy Clark (novel 1) (February 2017)
Knightsblade by Andy Clark (novel 2) (February 2018)

Inquisitors

Eisenhorn
Authored by Dan Abnett
Xenos (May 2001)
Malleus (December 2001)
Hereticus (January 2002)
The Magos (February 2018)

Ravenor
Authored by Dan Abnett
Ravenor (March 2005)
Ravenor Returned (June 2006)
Ravenor Rogue (January 2008)

Bequin
Authored by Dan Abnett
Pariah: Ravenor vs. Eisenhorn (November 2012)
Penitent (March 2021)

Czevak
Authored by Rob Sanders
Necessary Evil (novella) (March 2011)
Atlas Infernal (novel) (July 2011)

Inquisition

Vaults of Terra trilogy
The Carrion Throne by Chris Wraight (novel 1) (May 2017)
The Hollow Mountain by Chris Wraight (novel 2) (July 2019)
The Dark City by Chris Wraight (novel 3) (July 2022)

The Horusian Wars trilogy
Resurrection by John French (novel 1) (July 2017)
Incarnation by John French (novel 2) (July 2018)
Divination by John French (anthology) (October 2019)

Agent of the Throne audio drama series
Blood & Lies by John French (August 2017)
Truth & Dreams by John French (April 2018)
Ashes & Oaths by John French (May 2019)

Watchers of the Throne trilogy
The Emperor's Legion by Chris Wraight (novel 1) (September 2017)
The Regent's Shadow by Chris Wraight (novel 2) (February 2020)

Other stories
Rites of Passage by Mike Brooks (novel) (August 2019)

Inquisition War
Authored by Ian Watson

Inquisitor (1990) (reprinted as Draco in 2002)
Harlequin (1994)
Chaos Child (1995)

Iron Hands
Iron Hands by Jonathan Green (novel) (2004)
Medusan Wings by Matt Westbrook (novella) (July 2016)
The Eye of Medusa by David Guymer (novel 1) (April 2017)
The Voice of Mars by David Guymer (novel 2) (April 2018)

Iron Warriors

Authored by Graham McNeill these works are closely linked to the Ultramarines Series
Storm of Iron (novel) (May 2002)
Iron Warrior (novella) (April 2010)

Last Chancers
Authored by Gav Thorpe
Thirteenth Legion (December 2000)
Kill Team (October 2001)
Annihilation Squad (March 2004)
Armageddon Saint (December 2019)

Legends of the Dark Millennium
Farsight by Phil Kelly (novel) (October 2015)
Deathwatch by Ian St. Martin (novel) (August 2016)
Genestealer Cults by Peter Fehervari (novel) (September 2016)
Ultramarines by various (anthology 1) (August 2016 - paperback)
Shas'o by various (anthology 2) (September 2016 - paperback)
Sons of Corax by George Mann (anthology 3) (November 2016 - paperback)
Astra Militarum by various (anthology 4) (December 2016 - paperback)
Space Wolves by various (anthology 5) (February 2017 - paperback)

Macharian Crusade
Angel of Fire by William King (July 2012)
Fist of Demetrius by William King (May 2013)
Fall of Macharius by William King (July 2014)

Necromunda

Novel series
Survival Instinct by Andy Chambers (May 2005)
Salvation by Cassern S. Goto (May 2005)
Blood Royal by Gordon Rennie and Will McDermott (July 2005)
Junktion by Matthew Farrer (October 2005)
Fleshworks by Lucien Soulban (February 2006)
Cardinal Crimson by Will McDermott (May 2006)
Back from the Dead by Nick Kyme (August 2006)
Outlander by Matt Keefe (December 2006)
Lasgun Wedding by Will McDermott (April 2007)
Terminal Overkill by Justin D. Hill (March 2019)
Kal Jerico: Sinner's Bounty by Josh Reynolds (February 2020)
Soulless Fury by Will McDermott (July 2020)

Other stories
Underhive by "various" (anthology) (July 2019)
"Status:Deadzone" by "various" (anthology) (November 2000)

Night Lords
Authored by Aaron Dembski-Bowden

Novel series
Soul Hunter (March 2010)
Blood Reaver (May 2011)
Void Stalker (May 2012)

Other stories
Throne of Lies (audio drama) (August 2010)

Lord of the Night (2005)

Orks
Sanctus Reach: Evil Sun Rising by Guy Haley (novella) (July 2014)
Claw of mork Guy Haley (Audio drama) (July 2014)
Prophets of Waaagh! by Guy Haley (audio drama) (October 2018)
Brutal Kunnin by Mike Brooks (novel) (September 2020)
Da Gobbo's Revenge by Mike Brooks (November 2021)
Ghazghkull Thraka: Prophet of the Waaagh! by Nate Crowley (March 2022)

Path of the Eldar
Authored by Gav Thorpe
Path of the Warrior (July 2010)
Path of the Seer (September 2011)
Path of the Outcast (September 2012)

Phoenix Lords
Asurmen: Hand of Asuryan by Gav Thorpe (novel) (September 2016)
Asurmen: The Darker Road by Gav Thorpe (audio drama) (February 2017)
Jain Zar: The Storm of Silence by Gav Thorpe (novel) (April 2017)

Raven Guard
Authored by George Mann
Hellion Rain (audio drama) (February 2011)
Labyrinth of Sorrows (audio drama) (February 2012)
The Unkindness of Ravens (novella) (May 2012)
With Baited Breath (audio drama) (November 2012)
The Geld (audio drama) (November 2017)
Soulbound (audio drama) (August 2018)

Rise of the Ynnari 
Ghost Warrior by Gav Thorpe (novel 1) (October 2017)
Wild Rider by Gav Thorpe (novel 2) (November 2018)

Rogue Trader

Novel trilogy
Authored by Andy Hoare
Rogue Star (August 2006)
Star of Damocles (August 2007)
Savage Scars (March 2011)

Other storiesCorsair: The Face of the Void by James Swallow (audio drama) (January 2018)

Blackstone Fortress seriesBlackstone Fortress by Darius Hinks (novel) (November 2018)Vaults of Obsidian by "various" (anthology) (November 2019)

Salamanders
Authored by Nick Kyme

Tome of Fire trilogySalamander (September 2009)Firedrake (November 2010)Nocturne (November 2011)Tome of Fire (anthology) (December 2012)

Circle of Fire trilogyRebirth (November 2016)

Shira Calpurnia
Authored by Matthew FarrerCrossfire (June 2003)Legacy (July 2004)Blind (July 2006)

Silver SkullsSilver Skulls: Portents by S.P. Cawkwell (November 2015)

 Soul Drinkers 
Authored by Ben Counter

Novel seriesSoul Drinker (September 2002)The Bleeding Chalice (December 2003)Crimson Tears (February 2005)Chapter War (April 2007)Hellforged (April 2009)Phalanx (April 2012)

Other storiesDaenyathos (novella) (August 2010)

 Space Marine Battles 

Novels and Anthologies001: Rynn's World by Steve Parker (February 2010)002: Helsreach by Aaron Dembski-Bowden (May 2010)003: The Hunt For Voldorius by Andy Hoare (September 2010)004: The Purging of Kadillus by Gav Thorpe (February 2011)005: The Fall of Damnos by Nick Kyme (April 2011)006: Battle of the Fang by Chris Waight (June 2011)007: The Gildar Rift by Sarah Cawkwell (December 2011)008: Catechism of Hate (Novella) Gav Thorpe (January 2012)009: Legion of the Damned by Rob Sanders (April 2012)010: Architect of Fate by "various" (this anthology includes the novellas "Accursed Eternity, Endeavour of Will, Fateweaver and Sanctus") (May 2012)011: Wrath of Iron by Chris Wraight (June 2012)012: The Siege of Castellax by C.L. Werner (December 2012)013: The Death of Antagonis by David Annandale (February 2013)014: The Death of Integrity by Guy Haley (September 2013)015: Malodrax by Ben Counter (January 2014)016: Overfiend by David Annandale (this anthology includes the novellas "Stormseer, Shadow Captain and Forge Master") (June 2014)017: Pandorax by C.Z. Dunn (November 2014)018: Damocles by "various" (this anthology includes the novellas "Blood Oath, Broken Sword, Black Leviathan and Hunter's Snare") (March 2015)019: The World Engine by Ben Counter (April 2015)020: Sanctus Reach by "various" (this anthology includes the novellas "Evil Sun Rising and Blood on the Mountain" and short stories) (December 2015)021: Flesh Tearers by Andy Smillie (the anthology includes the novellas "Flesh of Cretacia, Sons of Wrath and Trial by Blood") (February 2016)022: Blades of Damocles by Phil Kelly (April 2016)023: The Plagues of Orath by "various" (this anthology includes the novellas "Plague Harvest, Engines of War and Armour of Faith") (July 2016)024: Crusaders of Dorn by Guy Haley (this anthology includes short stories) (August 2016)025: Calgar's Siege by Paul Kearney (September 2016)026: Storm of Damocles by Justin D. Hill (September 2016)027: Tyrant of the Hollow Worlds by Mark Clapham (December 2016)028: Shield of Baal by "various" (this anthology includes the novellas "Deathstorm, Tempestus and Devourer") (January 2017)029: Scythes of the Emperor by L.J. Goulding (includes the novel "Slaughter at Giant's Coffin" and five short stories) (February 2017)030: The Eye of Ezekiel by C.Z. Dunn (March 2017)

Space Marine Legends seriesLemartes' by David Annandale (2015)
Ragnar Blackmane by Aaron Dembski-Bowden (December 2016)
Cassius by Ben Counter (February 2017)
Shrike by George Mann (March 2017)
Azrael by Gav Thorpe (May 2017)

Lords of the Space Marines series
Mephiston: Lord of Death by David Annandale (novella) (January 2013)
Arjac Rockfist: Anvil of Fenris by Ben Counter (novella) (March 2014)
Lemartes: Guardian of the Lost by David Annandale (novel) (March 2016)

Omnibus
"Armageddon" by Aaron Dembski-Bowden (this omnibus includes the novel Helsreach and the novella "Blood and Fire") (July 2013)
"Damnos" by Nick Kyme (this omnibus includes the novel "Fall of Damnos" and the novella "Spear of Macragge") (September 2013)
"The War for Rynn's World" by Steve Parker and Mike Lee (this omnibus includes the novel "Rynn's World", the novella "Traitor's Gorge" and short stories) (August 2014)
"War of the Fang" by Chris Wraight (this omnibus includes the novel "Battle of the Fang" and the novella "Hunt for Magnus") (January 2015)

Space Marine Conquests

Novels
001: The Devastation of Baal by Guy Haley (November 2017)
002: The Ashes of Prospero by Gav Thorpe (March 2018)
003: War of Secrets by Phil Kelly (June 2018)
004: Of Honour and Iron by Ian St. Martin (September 2018)
005: Apocalypse by Josh Reynolds (July 2019)
006: Fist of the Imperium by Andy Clark (February 2020)

Space Marines Heroes series
Blood Rite by Rachel Harrison (novella) (September 2019)

Other stories
On Wings of Blood by "various" (anthology) (September 2019)

Space Wolves

Ragnar series
Space Wolf by William King (December 1999)
Ragnar's Claw by William King (July 2000)
Grey Hunter by William King (February 2002)
Wolfblade by William King (October 2003)
Sons of Fenris by Lee Lightner (January 2007)
Wolf's Honour by Lee Lightner (March 2008)

Sagas of the Space Wolves series
Sons of Russ (e-book anthology of previously published short stories) (July 2012)

Blood of Asaheim series
Blood of Asaheim by Chris Wraight (April 2013)
Stormcaller by Chris Wraight (September 2014)
The Helwinter Gate by Chris Wraight (December 2020)

War Zone: Fenris series
Curse of the Wulfen by David Annandale (novel) (2016)
Legacy of Russ I: The Lost King by Robbie MacNiven (short story) (2016)
Legacy of Russ II: The Young Wolf's Return by Robbie MacNiven (short story) (2016)
Legacy of Russ III: Lying in Flames by Robbie MacNiven (short story) (2016)
Legacy of Russ IV: The Broken Crown by Robbie MacNiven (short story) (2016)
Legacy of Russ V: Infurnace by Robbie MacNiven (short story) (2016)
Legacy of Russ VI: Wolf Trap by Robbie MacNiven (short story) (2016)
Legacy of Russ VII: The Wild King by Robbie MacNiven (short story) (2016)
Legacy of Russ VIII: Fate Unbound by Robbie MacNiven (short story) (2016)
Vox Tenebris by Robbie MacNiven (audio drama) (October 2016)
Legacy of the Wulfen by David Annandale & Robbie MacNiven (this anthology includes "Curse of the Wulfen" & "Legacy of Russ" (June 2017)

Other stories
Deathwolf (audio drama) (January 2013)
Hunter's Moon (audio drama) (November 2013)
Lukas the Trickster by Josh Reynolds (novel) (February 2018)

T'au Empire
Farsight: Crisis of Faith by Phil Kelly (novel 1) (July 2017)
Farsight: Empire of Lies by Phil Kelly (novel 2) (February 2020)

Ultramarines
Authored by Graham McNeill these works are closely linked to the Iron Warriors Series

Novel series
Nightbringer (January 2002)
Warriors of Ultramar (March 2003)
Dead Sky Black Sun (October 2004)
The Killing Ground (June 2008)
Courage and Honour (June 2009)
The Chapter's Due (June 2010)

Other stories
Eye of Vengeance by Graham McNeill (audio drama) (May 2012)
Calgar's Fury by Paul Kearney (novel) (October 2017)
Blood of Iax by Robbie MacNiven (novel) (September 2018)
Knights Of Macragge by Nick Kyme (novel) (July 2019)
Indomitus by Gav Thorpe (novel) (July 2020)

White Scars
Savage Scars by Andy Hoare (novel) (March 2011)
The Last Hunt by Robbie MacNiven (novel) (November 2017)

Word Bearers
Authored by Anthony Reynolds

Novel series
Dark Apostle (September 2007)
Dark Disciple (December 2008)
Dark Creed (January 2010)

Warhammer Crime
Bloodlines by Chris Wraight (August 2020)
Flesh and Steel by Guy Haley (September 2020)
Grim Repast by Marc Collins (September 2021)
The Wraithbone Phoenix by Alec Worley

Anthologies
Broken City (August 2021)
No Good Men (August 2020)
Sanction and Sin (September 2021)
The Vorbis Conspiracy

Audio dramas
Dredge Runners by Alec Worley (August 2020)

Warhammer 40k Other Releases

Anthologies
Into The Maelstrom edited by Marc Gascoigne and Andy Jones (September 1999)
Dark Imperium edited by Marc Gascoigne and Andy Jones (January 2001)
Deathwing edited by Neil Jones and David Pringle (November 2001)
Words of Blood edited by Marc Gascoigne and Christian Dunn (July 2002)
Crucible of War edited by Marc Gascoigne and Christian Dunn (May 2003)
What Price Victory edited by Marc Gascoigne and Christian Dunn (April 2004)
Bringers of Death edited by Marc Gascoigne and Christian Dunn (August 2005)
Let The Galaxy Burn edited by Marc Gascoigne and Christian Dunn (April 2006)
Tales from the Dark Millennium edited by Marc Gascoigne and Christian Dunn (October 2006)
Planetkill edited by Nick Kyme and Lindsey Priestley (July 2008)
The Book of Blood edited by Christian Dunn (April 2010) contains
Space Hulk by Gav Thorpe
Crimson Night by James Swallow
The Blood of Angels by C.S. Goto
Heart of Rage by James Swallow
At Gaius Point by Aaron Dembski-Bowden
Blood Debt by James Swallow
Fear The Alien edited by Christian Dunn (September 2010)
The Space Marine Script Book edited by Christian Dunn (collects audio drama scripts) (December 2012)

Space Marines anthology series
Heroes of the Space Marines edited by Nick Kyme and Lindsey Priestley (May 2009)
Legends of the Space Marines edited by Christian Dunn (May 2010)
Victories of the Space Marines edited by Christian Dunn (April 2011)
Treacheries of the Space Marines edited by Christian Dunn (October 2012)

Audio dramas
Thunder from Fenris by Nick Kyme (December 2009)
The Madness Within by Steve Lyons (August 2011)
Mission: Purge by Gav Thorpe (September 2012)
Perfection by Nick Kyme (October 2012)
Chosen of Khorne by Anthony Reynolds (October 2012)
Doomseeker by Nick Kyme (e-audio drama short) (November 2012)

Gamebooks
Hive of the Dead by Christian Dunn (September 2011)
Herald of Oblivion by Jonathan Green (July 2012)

Novels
Space Marine by Ian Watson (1993)
Eye of Terror by Barrington J. Bayley (November 1999)
Pawns of Chaos by Brian Stableford (April 2001)
Farseer by William King (May 2002)
Angels of Darkness by Gav Thorpe (February 2003)
Daemon World by Ben Counter (April 2003)
Fire Warrior by Simon Spurrier (September 2003)
Iron Hands by Jonathan Green (August 2004)
Eldar Prophecy by Cassern S. Goto (February 2007)
Relentless by Richard Williams (April 2008)
Brothers of the Snake by Dan Abnett (May 2008)
Assault on Black Reach by Nick Kyme (September 2008)
Space Hulk: The Novel by Gav Thorpe (September 2009)
Sons of Dorn by Chris Roberson (January 2010)

E-shorts
"For The Fallen" * by Aaron Dembski-Bowden (March 2012)
"Kill Hill" * by Dan Abnett (March 2012)
"The Weakness of Others" * by Laurie Goulding (March 2012)
"All is Dust" by John French (April 2012)
"Evil Eye" * by David Annandale (April 2012)
"Eclipse of Hope" by David Annandale (July 2012)

Hammer and Bolter stories

Hammer and Bolter was a download-only Black Library monthly e-magazine published between October 2010 and November 2012. It included short stories, novel extracts, and serialized novellas in text and audio formats.
"Hunted" by John French (Issue 4)
"Action & Consequence" by Sarah Cawkwell (Issue 5)
"Tower of Blood" by Tony Ballantyne (Issue 6)
"Flesh" by Chris Wraight (Issue 7)
"Cause and Effect" by Sarah Cawkwell (Issue 8)
"A Commander Shadow" by Braden Campbell (Issue 8)
"The Arkunasha War" by Andy Chambers (Issue 9)
"We Are One" by John French (Issue 10)
"Bitter End" by Sarah Cawkwell (Issue 12 - October 2011)
"Aenarion" by Gav Thorpe (Issue 12 - October 2011)
"The Inquisition" by Ben Counter (Issue 12 - October 2011)
"Reparation" by Andy Smillie (Issue 13)
"Lesser Evils" by Tom Foster (Issue 13)
"Hunted" by Braden Campbell (Issue 13)
"In the Shadow of the Emperor" by Chris Dows (Issue 14)
"The Pact" by Sarah Cawkwell (Issue 15)
"The Shadow in the Glass" by Steve Lyons (Issue 16)
"Vermilion" by Ben Counter (Issue 17)
"Irixa" by Ben Counter (Issue 19)
"In Hrondir's Tomb" by Mark Clapham (Issue 20)
"The Shadow of the Beast " by Laurie Goulding (Issue 21)
"The Mouth of Chaos" by Chris Dows (Issue 22)
"Tyrant's Chosen" by Sarah Cawkwell (Issue 23)
"The Rite of Holos" by Guy Haley (Issue 24)

Inferno! stories
Inferno! was a bi-monthly print magazine published by the Black Library between July 1997 and January 2005.
 "Altar of Cyrene" by Lucien Soulban (Issue 45) (November–December 2004)

See also
Warhammer 40,000 comics

References

External links
  official website of the main Games Workshop fiction imprint

Science fiction lists
Novels about extraterrestrial life
Novels set on fictional planets
Warhammer 40,000 novels
Lists of novels based on works